Sultan Muhammad Shah ibni Almarhum Sultan Megat Iskandar Shah (died 1444), also popularly known as Raja Tengah or Radin Tengah, was the third sultan of Malacca. He is the son of Megat Iskandar Shah of Malacca. He ruled Malacca from 1424 to 1444. Some sources named the third ruler of Malacca as Sri Maharaja. Some sources also named him as Sultan Mohammad Shah, although different versions suggest that Sultan Mohammad Shah was Raja Tengah's son. He had two sons, Raja Kasim and Raja Ibrahim. He was succeeded by Abu Syahid Shah.

The Dream
It was said that one night the king had a dream. He dreamt that he saw the Islamic Prophet Muhammad clearly and Prophet Muhammad subsequently told him to repeat 'there is no God but Allah and Muhammad is His messenger'. After the king repeated these words, Prophet Muhammad said that a ship from Jeddah would anchor at the time for afternoon prayers, and the king was to follow the directions of the man who would come out of the ship to pray. With that, Prophet Muhammad disappeared from sight. Sure enough, everything described in the dream happened. After he travelled onto the ship, he arrived in Mecca where he lived until his death in 1444.

Baju Melayu
The king is the inventor of Baju Melayu or initially known as Baju Kurung.

References

1444 deaths
Sultans of Malacca
History of Malacca
15th-century monarchs in Asia